Main–Spanish Commercial Historic District is a national historic district located around Main and Spanish Streets in Cape Girardeau, Missouri.  The district encompasses 26 contributing buildings in the central business district of Cape Girardeau.  It developed between about 1880 and 1958, and includes representative examples of Italianate, Colonial Revival, Mission Revival, and Streamline Moderne style architecture.  Located in the district is the separately listed Klostermann Block.  Other notable buildings are F.W. Woolworth Company (1950), J.C. Penney Company (1928), Kraft Bakery (c. 1884), Great Atlantic & Pacific Tea Co (A&P) (1941), and Millikan Motor Co. (1941).

It was listed on the National Register of Historic Places in 2008.

References

Historic districts on the National Register of Historic Places in Missouri
Commercial buildings on the National Register of Historic Places in Missouri
Colonial Revival architecture in Missouri
Mission Revival architecture in Missouri
Italianate architecture in Missouri
Historic districts in Cape Girardeau County, Missouri
National Register of Historic Places in Cape Girardeau County, Missouri